Ray Alden (July 2, 1942 – September 19, 2009) was active in the Old Time Music community for nearly 40 years. He had taught at The Tennessee Banjo Institute, Augusta Folk Heritage Institute, Banjo Camp North, appeared in concerts, workshops, and on recordings. He was best known for his pioneering work recording traditional and second generation Appalachian banjo and fiddle players and styles, for which he received many awards, including a Grammy nomination. They include "Tommy And Fred - North Carolina Master Fiddle-Banjo Duets", "MountAiry USA", "The Young Fogies", and "The American Fogies". His publications include "Advanced Speaker Systems", "Music From Round Peak" and numerous articles and photographs.

Ray Alden was the founder of and frequent contributor to The Field Recorder's Collective.

Earlier in life Ray worked as a counselor at Trywoodie Camp in Hyde Park, New York.  He also taught mathematics at Stuyvesant High School in New York City for 25 years.

References

External links
The Field Recorder's Collective
Ray Alden Interview 11/2003 Banjo Newsletter
"Advanced Speaker Systems" by Ray Alden

1942 births
2009 deaths
American country singer-songwriters
American banjoists
Old-time musicians
American folk musicians
American folk-song collectors
20th-century American singers
Country musicians from Tennessee
Singer-songwriters from Tennessee